MKE Kırıkkalespor is a sports club located in Kırıkkale, Turkey. The football club plays in the Regional Amateur League.

League participations
 Turkish Super League: 1978–79
 TFF First League: 1974–78, 1979–88, 1999–01
 TFF Second League: 1967–74, 1988–99, 2001–09
 TFF Third League: 2009–12
 Regional Amateur League: 2012–15, 2016-18
 Kırıkkale 1st Amateur League: 2015-16, 2018-

References

External links
Official website
Kırıkkalespor on TFF.org

 
Sport in Kırıkkale
Football clubs in Turkey
Association football clubs established in 1967
1967 establishments in Turkey
Süper Lig clubs